Pseudolinda quinquepunctata is a species of beetle in the family Cerambycidae, and the only species in the genus Pseudolinda. It was described by Henry Walter Bates in 1881.

References

Saperdini
Beetles described in 1881